The Ohio Collegiate Athletic Conference was a collegiate athletic conference affiliated with the United States Collegiate Athletic Association (USCAA) that began play as an athletic conference in 2009.

The OCAC was composed of seven colleges and universities throughout Ohio. Those members included Ohio State Marion, Clermont College, Clark State Community College, Southern State Community College, Ohio Christian University, World Harvest Bible College, and Temple Baptist College.

Sports
The OCAC sponsored championships in baseball, basketball, golf, and soccer for men; and in basketball, softball, soccer, and volleyball for women.

Former members

References

College sports conferences in the United States
College sports in Ohio
Sports organizations established in 2009